Condé-sur-Ifs is a commune in the Calvados department, in the Normandy region in northwestern France.

Population

See also
Condé (disambiguation)
Communes of the Calvados department

References

Communes of Calvados (department)
Calvados communes articles needing translation from French Wikipedia